Brompton is a village, civil parish and electoral ward in the Hambleton District of North Yorkshire, England, about  north of the county town of Northallerton. Practically a suburb of the nearby county town, the village was near the site of a battle between English and Scots armies and was the location of mills producing linen goods from the 18th century onward. With 2,055 people this village has grown considerably since the 1800s.

History

The village is mentioned in the Domesday Book of 1086 as Bruntone in the Allerton hundred. Prior to the invasion, the manor was granted to Earl Edwin, but subsequently granted in 1086 to the Crown and were added to the lands that were the possession of the Bishop of Durham St Cuthbert and remained so after 1086. In 1836 those lands were transferred to the see of Ripon. The village became an ecclesiastical parish in 1843.

The etymology of the name is derived from a combination of the Old English word brōm, meaning broom and the Old English suffix of tūn, meaning farm or settlement. Put together they mean broom farm.

The traditionally held location for the site of the Battle of the Standard in 1138 is land just north-west of the village, on an area of land bounded by the A167 road to the west, an overgrown track known as Scotpit Lane to the south and Brompton Lane to the east that is called Standard Hill. This site was also where local militia gathered prior to the campaign to retake Scotland by Edward I in 1303.

The village was an important centre for linen making and weaving in the 19th century with eight mills in the village at its peak in 1820 but declined by the early 20th century. The John Pattison Yeomans mill was located in what is now the residential area of Linen Way. Bricks from the demolished chimney of the John Wilford Mill on Station road now form a memorial to linen workers which is situated on Water End Green, opposite the Village Inn. The village is now largely residential with just a few small businesses, the Wilford Mill still remains and is occupied by small businesses; however, its iconic chimney has been demolished.

The village of Brompton has one of the earliest online interactive war memorials where it is possible to find out information about and see photographs of the soldiers to have died in the First World War and the Second World War from the Brompton area.

The river running through the village is named Willow Beck. This was the water source for the linen mills and as result created regular floods, mainly at the Water End area of the village. Since the factory's demolition flooding is no longer commonplace and the last time any properties suffered flood damage was 2000. Extensive flood defence work has since been carried out, mainly to protect the school and Station Road area by the building of flood banks. Engineering work has also been carried out on various parts of the river such as the removal and widening of bends in the banks and creating a bypass when the water reaches its peak.

Governance

The village lies within the Richmond UK Parliament constituency. It also lies within the North Hambleton electoral division of North Yorkshire County Council and the Brompton ward of Richmondshire District Council. The parish council is actually named as a town council and has a membership of nine councillors.

Geography

The village lies between the A167 Northallerton to Darlington road and the A684 Northallerton to Stokesley road. The village used to have a station on the railway line between Northallerton and Middlesbrough that passes around the northern boundary of the village. Willow Beck flows through the village as part of the tributary system of the River Wiske.

Demography

2001 census

The 2001 UK census showed that the population was split 48.4% male to 51.6% female. The religious constituency was made of 79.9% Christian, 0.15% Buddhist, 0.15% Jewish, 0.2% Muslim and the rest stating no religion or not stating at all. The ethnic make-up was 98.8% White British, 1% White Other/Irish, and 0.15% British Asian. There were 905 dwellings.

2011 census

The 2011 UK census showed that the population was split 49.4% male to 50.6% female. The religious constituency was made of 69.54% Christian, 0.05% Buddhist, 0.24% Muslim, 0.1% Hindu, 0.05% Jewish and the rest stating no religion or not stating at all. The ethnic make-up was 96.35% White British, 1.85% White Other/Irish, 0.58% Mixed Ethnic, 0.05 Black British, 0.19 Arab and other and 0.97% British Asian. There were 1,107 dwellings.

Culture and community

Education

Brompton Community Primary School has a capacity of around 210 children of mixed gender between the ages of 3 and 11. Pupils at this school are within the catchment area of Northallerton School & Sixth Form College for secondary education.

Amenities

There are three public houses in the village. The Green Tree, Crown Inn and the Village Inn, which reopened in 2011 after extensive refurbishment. The Three Horseshoes, which used to be opposite the Crown Inn, ceased to be a pub and is now two residential properties. However the exterior retains the appearance of a pub. Another public house once existed near the chapel called the Masons Arms. This is now a residential property however it has retained some of its pub character such as cellar doors and the wall still has the outline of the sign. Another pub, The Queen Catherine, was on the other side of the road on Cockpit Hill opposite The Three Horse Shoes. Brompton also boasts a thriving, active Village Hall for the benefit of all in the community, the Temperance hall, which is used daily and is home to the Brompton Players amateur dramatic group.

A small community café is located in Weavers Pavilion on Station Road next to the primary school. The village is also host to a single small convenience store, along the main road near St. Thomas' Church.

Sport

There has been a football team in the village since 1901. The football club play in the Hambleton League at the recreation ground on Station Road, where a new pavilion building was opened in 2011.

Religion

St Thomas' Church on High Green is a Grade I listed building dating from the 12th century with additions in the 14th and 15th centuries and a restoration undertaken in 1868. It is reputed to have the largest collection of hogback stone tombs in the United Kingdom. This collection of hogbacks and Viking period crosses suggests that Brompton was the base for a company of stone carvers during that period. It is thought that the Hogback was invented in the Allertonshire area since the Hogbacks at Brompton and Northallerton are amongst the oldest examples.

A Wesleyan chapel was first built in the village in 1794 and enlarged in 1817 with further renovation in 1878. Around 1820 a Primitive Methodist chapel was erected on Cockpit Hill. The two churches joined together in 1966.

References

External links

 Brompton Matters website
 Brompton Online War Memorial

Civil parishes in North Yorkshire
Villages in North Yorkshire